Parvin Mammadov is an Azerbaijani Paralympic powerlifter. He won bronze in the Men's 49 kg at the 2020 Summer Paralympics.

References

External links 
 

Living people
Paralympic powerlifters of Azerbaijan
Powerlifters at the 2020 Summer Paralympics
Medalists at the 2020 Summer Paralympics
1995 births
21st-century Azerbaijani people